The Beacon on Hendra Downs is a prominent hill,  high, located on the northeastern side of Bodmin Moor in the county of Cornwall, England.

References 

Hills of Cornwall
Bodmin Moor